Kristen Stalleland (6 February 1861 – 15 February 1949) was a Norwegian farmer, magazine editor, children's writer, biographer and translator.

Stalleland was born in Landvik. He founded the children's magazine Norsk Barneblad in 1887, originally called Sysvorti, and edited the magazine from 1887 to 1894, and from 1898 to 1904. He wrote several stories for children, a biography of Christian Jensen Lofthuus, and translated fairy tales into Norwegian language.

References

1861 births
1949 deaths
People from Aust-Agder
Norwegian children's writers
Norwegian magazine founders
Norwegian farmers